Sathupalle Assembly constituency is a SC reserved constituency of Telangana Legislative Assembly, India. It is one of 10 constituencies in Khammam district. It is part of Khammam Lok Sabha constituency.

Sandra Venkata Veeraiah of Telugu Desam Party is the MLA of the constituency.

Mandals
The Assembly Constituency presently comprises the following Mandals:

MLAs of Sathupalle

Election results

Telangana Legislative Assembly election, 2018

Telangana Legislative Assembly election, 2014

Trivia
 Jalagam Vengala Rao, former Chief Minister of Andhra Pradesh represented the constituency four times.

See also
 Sathupalli
 List of constituencies of Telangana Legislative Assembly

References

Assembly constituencies of Telangana
Khammam district